Harpster may refer to:

Harpster (surname)
Harpster, Idaho
Harpster, Ohio